Manjari  railway station is located in the Indian city of Pune. It serves Manjari, a suburban area of the city. There are plans to start long-distance trains from this station as there is no space for new trains at Pune Junction. There is also a plan to start suburban trains on Pune–Daund section. This station will be a major station for Pune–Daund suburban trains. The station consists of two platforms, neither well sheltered. It lacks many facilities including water and sanitation.

Trains
Trains passing through Manjari include:
 Pune–Baramati Passenger
 Pune–Baramati–Daund–Pune Passenger
 Pune–Daund Passenger
 Pune–Daund Passenger
 Pune–Daund Fast Passenger
 Pune–Manmad Passenger
 Pune–Nizamabad Passenger
 Pune–Solapur Passenger
 Pune–Solapur Passenger

See also
 
 
 
 Pune Suburban Railway

References

Pune Suburban Railway
Railway stations in Pune
Pune railway division
Railway stations in Pune district